Isodemis longicera is a moth of the family Tortricidae. It is found in Vietnam.

The wingspan is 22 mm. The ground colour of the forewings is cream, with weak, cream brown and brown suffusions. The markings are brownish with dark brown parts. The hindwings are pale brownish grey.

Etymology
The specific epithet refers to the terminal process of the sacculus and is derived from Latin longus (meaning long) and cera, from Greek keras (meaning a horn).

References

Moths described in 2009
Archipini
Moths of Asia
Taxa named by Józef Razowski